The 2011–12 BCHL season marked the 50th anniversary of the British Columbia Hockey League (BCHL). The sixteen teams from the Coastal and Interior Conferences played 60 game schedules.

Come March, the top teams from each division will play for the Fred Page Cup, the BCHL Championship. The winner of the Fred Page Cup plays the AJHL champion in a best-of-seven series for the right to represent the Pacific region in the Royal Bank Cup

Changes
The Fred Page Cup Playoffs have been reduced by one round. The top four teams from each conference will advance instead of the top six.
The Quesnel Millionaires moved to Chilliwack, becoming the Chilliwack Chiefs
In response to Chilliwack having a team again, the Langley Chiefs renamed themselves to the Langley Rivermen

Final standings
Note:  GP = Games Played, W = Wins, L = Losses, T = Ties, OTL = Overtime Losses, Pts = Points

Teams are listed on the official league website.

2011–2012 BCHL Fred Page Cup Playoffs

2012 Doyle Cup
The 2012 Doyle Cup was played between the BCHL Champion Penticton Vees, and the AJHL Champion Brooks Bandits

Game Results
Game 1: Penticton 7 – 2 Brooks
Game 2: Penticton 1 – 0 Brooks
Game 3: Brooks 4 – Penticton 3
Game 4: Brooks 1 – 6 Penticton
Game 5: Brooks 2 – 6 Penticton

Penticton would then move on to the 2012 Royal Bank Cup. They would win the national championship with a 4–3 win over the MHL champion Woodstock Slammers in the final.

Scoring leaders
GP = Games Played, G = Goals, A = Assists, P = Points, PIM = Penalties in minutes

Leading goaltenders
Note: GP = Games Played, Mins = Minutes Played, W = Wins, L = Losses, T = Ties, GA = Goals Against, SO = Shutouts, Sv% = Save Percentage, GAA = Goals against average.Regulation losses and overtime losses have been combined for total losses.

Based on goaltenders with a minimum of 20 games.

Award winners
With the exception of the Brett Hull Trophy and goaltender awards, each award is given to two players; One in each conference.

Brett Hull Trophy (Top Scorer): Paul De Jersey (Prince George)
Best Defenceman: Craig Dalrymple (Powell River) & Mike Reilly (Penticton)
Bruce Allison Memorial Trophy (Rookie of the Year): Alexander Kerfoot (Coquitlam) & Mario Lucia (Penticton)
Bob Fenton Trophy (Most Sportsmanlike): Alexander Kerfoot (Coquitlam) & Regan Soquila (Merritt)
Top Goaltender: Michael Garteig (Penticton)
Wally Forslund Memorial Trophy (Best Goaltending Duo): Sean Maguire & Jonah Inoo (Powell River)
Vern Dye Memorial Trophy (regular-season MVP): Alex Petan (Coquitlam) & Paul De Jersey (Prince George)
Joe Tennant Memorial Trophy (Coach of the Year): Matt Erhart (Surrey) & Fred Harbinson (Penticton)
Ron Boileau Memorial Trophy (Best Regular Season Record): Penticton Vees
Cliff McNabb Trophy (Coastal Conference Champions): Powell River Kings
Ryan Hatfield Trophy (Interior Conference Champions): Penticton Vees
Fred Page Cup (League Champions): Penticton Vees

Records broken
The Penticton Vees, with three NHL draftees on their squad, went on an unprecedented streak throughout the course of the season that saw multiple BCHL records fall:
Winning streak: 42 (New BCHL record)
Points: 110 (New BCHL record for a 60-game season)
Wins: 54 (New BCHL record for a 60-game season)

Players selected in 2012 NHL Entry Draft
Rd3 #63 Jujhar Khaira – Edmonton Oilers (Prince George)
Rd4 #113 Sean Maguire – Pittsburgh Penguins (Powell River)
Rd5 #141 Reace Willcox – Philadelphia Flyers (Merritt)
Rd5 #150 Alexander Kerfoot – New Jersey Devils (Coquiltlam)
Rd6 #177 Wesley Myron – Vancouver Canucks (Victoria)

See also
2012 Royal Bank Cup
Doyle Cup
List of BCHL seasons
British Columbia Hockey League
Canadian Junior Hockey League
2011 in ice hockey
2012 in ice hockey

References

External links
Official website of the British Columbia Hockey League
Official website of the Canadian Junior Hockey League

BCHL
British Columbia Hockey League seasons